El País King of European Soccer (alternative: El País European Player of the Year)  was an annual football award given by Uruguayan newspaper El País to the best footballer in Europe. It had been decided by several European sports experts, critics and journalists based on votes. Any player from a European team was eligible, regardless their country of origin. It was first awarded in 1991 with French Jean-Pierre Papin having been the inaugural winner. The last winner was Argentine Lionel Messi in 2012. Messi and Zinedine Zidane are the record winners of the award with four wins each.

Winners
Source:

Most wins by player 
Consecutive wins
 Lionel Messi is the only player in history to win the award in 4 consecutive years (2009, 2010, 2011, 2012).
 Zinedine Zidane and Ronaldinho won the award in 3 successive years (2001, 2002, 2003 and 2004, 2005, 2006, respectively).
 Brazilian Ronaldo won the award twice in a row (1996, 1997).

European Coach of the Year

See also 
 Onze Mondial European Footballer of the Year
 World Soccer Player of the Year
 The Guardian 100 Best Male Footballers in the World
 FourFourTwo Player of the Year Award
 FIFA World Player of the Year
ESM Team of the Season

References

External links 
 Original edition site: https://www.elpais.com.uy/
 English edition site: https://elpais.com/elpais/inenglish.html

Association football trophies and awards